John Fleetwood may refer to:

John Fleetwood (died 1590), MP for Staffordshire
John Fleetwood (MP) (1686–1745), MP for Buckinghamshire 1713–1722
Sir John Fleetwood, 5th Baronet (died 1741), of the Fleetwood baronets